Werndl is an Austrian name and may refer to:
Werndl–Holub rifle

People
 Bill Werndl (born 1945), sports talk radio host
 Josef Werndl, Austrian arms producer and inventor
 Charlotte Werndl, Austrian philosopher
 Jessica von Bredow-Werndl (born 1986), German dressage rider